{{DISPLAYTITLE:C17H18N2}}
The molecular formula C17H18N2 (molar mass: 250.34 g/mol, exact mass: 250.1470 u) may refer to:

 Amfetaminil
 Tröger's base

Molecular formulas